Cameron Humphreys (born 30 October 2003) is an English professional footballer who plays as a midfielder for Ipswich Town.

Career
Humphreys signed as a full-time scholar with Ipswich Town in June 2020. He signed his first professional contract with Ipswich in June 2021, signing a two-year deal with the option of an additional one-year extension. He made his senior debut on 10 August 2021, starting in a 0–1 EFL Cup defeat to Newport County.

Humphreys was part of the U18 Professional Development League Cup winning squad for Ipswich Town, winning 7–0 against Coventry City in April 2022, registering three assists.

He made his league debut as a second-half substitute in a 0–2 away defeat against Charlton Athletic on 7 December. His second league appearance came in the final match of the season, also against Charlton Athletic, coming on as a second-half substitute and providing an assist for the final goal as Ipswich won 4–0. Humphreys won Ipswich’s Young Player of the Year award for the 2021–22 season. On 8 June 2022, Humphreys signed a new 3-year contract with Ipswich until 2025.

Career statistics

Honours
Individual
Ipswich Town Young Player of the Year: 2021–22

References

2003 births
Living people
English footballers
Association football midfielders
Ipswich Town F.C. players